Almgren is a Swedish surname. Notable people with the surname include:

Carl Eric Almgren (1913–2001), Swedish general and the army chief from 1969 to 1976 
Erik Almgren  (1908–1989), Swedish footballer and football manager
Esko Almgren (born 1932), Finnish politician
Frederick J. Almgren Jr. (1933– 1997), American mathematician 
Jim Almgren Gândara, Swedish singer and guitar player 
Johanna Almgren, Swedish female footballer 
Oscar Almgren (1869–1945), Swedish archaeologist specializing in prehistoric archaeology

Swedish-language surnames